, also known as , was a Japanese waka poet of the mid-Heian period. One of her poems was included in the Ogura Hyakunin Isshu. She produced a private collection, the Sagami-shū.

Biography 
Sagami's dates are unknown, but she was probably born around 1000. Her real name was Oto-jijū.

Her paternal ancestry is unknown, but she was supposedly a daughter of Minamoto no Yorimitsu. The fourteenth-century work Chokusen Sakusha Burui (勅撰作者部類) claims Yorimitsu was her father, but the Kin'yōshū includes a renga by Yorimitsu and "Sagami's mother" (相模母), so it is also possible he was her adoptive father. Her mother was a daughter of Yoshishige no Yasuaki, governor of Noto (前能登守慶滋保章).

She served , one of the sons of Emperor Ichijō.

Poetry 
109 of her poems were included in imperial anthologies starting with the Goshūi Wakashū. She was included in the Late Classical Thirty-Six Immortals of Poetry.

The following poem by her was included as No. 65 in Fujiwara no Teika's Ogura Hyakunin Isshu:

References

Works cited

External links
Sagami's poems in the International Research Center for Japanese Studies's online waka database.
Sagami-shū in the same database.
Sagami on Kotobank.

11th-century Japanese poets
Hyakunin Isshu poets
Japanese women poets
Date of death unknown
Year of birth unknown
Year of death unknown